Luo Jian Fan (born on 23 September 1963 in Anhua, Hunan), is a playwright and novelist. He had worked as an actor and musician in his early years in a local musical troupe in Hunan and later he was admitted to Shanghai Theater Academy for playwriting studies.  During the third year in the drama school, he wrote his first full-length play,  Black Stallion (simplified Chinese 黑骏马; traditional Chinese 黑駿馬).  The play was performed in Shanghai, Beijing and Hohhot in 1986, and it was very successful.  "it is the monument of a decade in our new era", cited from the  symposium held by China Theatre Association.  in 1986, after his graduation, Luo Jian Fan was invited by China's national theatre, China Youth Art Theatre (at the time), to be the playwright.  Luo Jian Fan relocated himself to the United States due to family reunion in 1994 and later became a US citizen.

Main Works 
Theater plays (playwright): Black Stallion, King Gesar, The Cornered Beast, To Be Stranded.

Films(screenwriter): My Mongolian Mother, Paerzatege( The Homeland).

TV dramas: The Silent Aimin River, The House of Detention.

Novel: An Exhausted Life 疲惫人生

Awards

Black Stallion, won Tianhan Drama Prize, 1986

The Silent Aimin Riveer, won Five Ones Projest Award ( from the central Chinese government), 2003

nominated for The Golden Eagle Award, 2003

won Steed Award (from Inner Mongolian government), 2003

My Mongolian Mother, won the Best Scriptwriting (the 29th Fajr International Film Festival, Iran), 2011

won the 14th Chinese Huabiao Film Award for Best Actress, 2011

won the 28th Chinese Golden Rooster Award for Best Actress, 2011

References

1963 births
People's Republic of China novelists
Living people
Chinese dramatists and playwrights
People from Yiyang
Writers from Hunan
People with acquired American citizenship